Minister of Finance of Equatorial Guinea is a political position in the Cabinet of Equatorial Guinea.

Ministers of Finance
Augustin Eñesi Neñe, 1966-1968
Andrés Ikuga Ebombebombe, 1968-1972
Andres Nko Ibassa Rondo, 1972-1976
Daniel Oyono Ayingono Mbá, 1976-1977-?
Teodoro Obiang Nguema Mbasogo, 1979
Salvador Elá Nseng, 1979-1980
Eulogio Oyó, 1980-1981
Andres Nko Ibassa Rondo, 1981-1985
, 1985-1986
Felipe Hinestrosa Ikaka, 1986-1988
Antonio Fernando Nve Ngu, 1988-1992
Anatolio Ndong Mba, 1993-1996
, 1996
Marcelino Oyono Ntutumu, 1996-1998
Baltasar Engonga Edjo, 1998
Anatolio Ndong Mba, 1998
Baltasar Engonga Edjo, 1998-1999
Miguel Abia Biteo Boricó, 1999-2000
Baltasar Engonga Edjo, 2000-2004
, 2004-2010
Melchor Esono Edjo, 2010-2011
Crisantos Ebe Mba, 2011-2012
, 2012-2015
Miguel Engonga Obiang, 2015-2018
, 2018-2019
César Augusto Mba Abogó, 2019-2020
Valentín Ela Maye, 2020-

See also 
 Economy of Equatorial Guinea

References

External links 
 Ministry of Finance

Government ministers of Equatorial Guinea

Economy of Equatorial Guinea